Elections to Coventry City Council were held on 7 May 1998.  One third of the council was up for election and the Labour party kept overall control of the council.

After the election, the composition of the council was
Labour 45
Conservative 7
Independent 1
Others 1

Election result

References

1998
1998 English local elections
20th century in Coventry
Birmingham